Shen Shuangmei (born 2 May 1998) is a Chinese rower. She competed in the 2020 Summer Olympics.

References

1998 births
Living people
Rowers at the 2020 Summer Olympics
Chinese female rowers
Olympic rowers of China